Shelf (: shelves) may refer to:

 Shelf (storage), a flat horizontal surface used for display and storage

Geology
 Continental shelf, the extended perimeter of a continent, usually covered by shallow seas
 Ice shelf, a thick platform of ice floating on the ocean surface

Places and entities
 Shelf, West Yorkshire, a village in England
 Shelf corporation, a company or corporation that has had no activity
 Shelf (organization), a UK health services organisation

Other uses
 Light shelf, a reflective element placed outside of a window to enhance room illumination by natural light
 Shelf (computing), a user interface feature in the NeXTSTEP operating system
 "Shelf" (song), a 2008 song by the Jonas Brothers
 Shelf life, the length of time that perishable items are considered suitable for sale or consumption
 Shelf registration, a registration arrangement for the sale of securities
 Sulphur shelf, an edible mushroom

See also
 Off the shelf (disambiguation)